Hasan Abbasifar (born 1972) is an international Chess Grandmaster titled in 2013. He was born in Shiraz, Iran. He played the game from 1994 to 2019.  Hasan is a member of the national chess team, Islamic Republic of Iran.

Awards 
Hassan Abbassifar is the first international grandmaster of Shiraz and the province of Fars, where he won the 1990 and 1991 chess championship. In 1994, he managed to reach the final of the national championship, which allowed him to qualify as a member of the Iranian national chess team at the World Olympics in Russia. In 1994-95, he was placed second in the national semi-rapid championship.

During the 1999-2000 season, he beat the players in the Iranian league to win with a difference of 1.5 points over his runner-up. The same year, he participated in the student world championship in the Netherlands and won the gold medal for his personal performance on his chess board while playing for the national team at the Asian games in China .

In 2001, he was again a finalist in the Iranian championship which allowed him to be selected for the Olympiad . Once again crowned student chess champion, he participates in the world student championship in Malaysia .

Other chess activities 
Hassan Abbassifar coaches the Iranian national youth team in international tournaments in Turkey and India and at the Asian Games in Singapore . He headed the chess federation of the province of Fars for eight years, the province of which he created the first chess school. Hassan Abbassifar is also the author of several books on chess.

Tournaments 
 Karoun Masters Cup 2019
 13th Dubai Open
 Aeroflot Open B
 Fajr op 14th

References 

1972 births
Living people
Chess grandmasters